The Germany women's national under-21 field hockey team represents Germany in women's international under-21 field hockey competitions and is controlled by the German Hockey Federation, the governing body for field hockey in Germany.

The team competes in the EuroHockey Junior Championships which they have won nine times. They have qualified for all Junior World Cups which they have won once in 1989.

Tournament record

Junior World Cup
 1989 – 
 1993 – 
 1997 – 4th place
 2001 – 7th place
 2005 – 
 2009 – 6th place
 2013 – 10th place
 2016 – 5th place
 2021 – 
 2023 – Qualified

EuroHockey Junior Championship
 1977 – 
 1978 – 
 1979 – 
 1981 – 
 1984 – 
 1988 – 
 1992 – 
 1996 – 
 1998 – 
 2000 – 4th place
 2002 – 
 2004 – 
 2006 – 
 2008 – 
 2010 – 4th place
 2012 – 4th place
 2014 – 
 2017 – 4th place
 2019 – 
 2022 – 

Source:

See also
 Germany men's national under-21 field hockey team
 Germany women's national field hockey team

References

Under-21
Women's national under-21 field hockey teams
Field hockey